Craig Challen,   is an Australian technical diver and cave explorer who played a substantial role in the Tham Luang cave rescue. He was the recipient of the Oztek 2009 Diver of the Year award for his services to caving, and was joint winner of the 2019 Australian of the Year.

He grew up in the Perth suburb of Thornlie and later on a  farming property in Gidgegannup; he attended Eastern Hills Senior High School in Mount Helena, near Gidgegannup. A veterinary surgeon by profession, Challen has made notable dives in Cocklebiddy Cave and Pearse Resurgence. In 2010 he made a record-setting  dive while caving in New Zealand.

Career
In 2018 Challen, along with his dive partner Richard Harris, was involved in a cave rescue operation in Thailand to evacuate 12 children and an adult from the flooded Tham Luang Cave system. On 24 July 2018, Challen was awarded the Star of Courage (SC) and Medal of the Order of Australia (OAM) by the Governor-General of Australia for his role in the rescue. On 7 September 2018 the King of Thailand appointed Challen as a Knight Grand Cross (First Class) of the Most Admirable Order of the Direkgunabhorn.

Awards
He is the joint-winner of the 2019 Australian of the Year award with fellow diver Richard Harris, and 2019 Western Australian of the Year.

See also
, on Challen's line in Cocklebiddy Cave

References

External links
 National Geographic, "Record Cave Dive Leaves Mystery", published 3 May 2011.
 Wet Mules homepage.

Living people
Year of birth missing (living people)
Australian underwater divers
Australian cavers
Australian veterinarians
Male veterinarians
Cave diving explorers
Place of birth missing (living people)
Recipients of the Medal of the Order of Australia
Recipients of the Star of Courage (Australia)
Australian of the Year Award winners
Craig Challen
Tham Luang cave rescue